The Fox Creek Stone Arch Bridge is a historic bridge across Fox Creek northwest of Strong City in Chase County, Kansas. The bridge was built in 1898 by B. Landry and Sons, who contracted with the Chase County government to build it for $2,000. The company built the bridge using limestone from a local quarry and arranged it in a single stone arch. It has carried county road traffic since its opening and is also part of the Community Connection Trail, which links Strong City with Tallgrass Prairie National Preserve.

The bridge was added to the National Register of Historic Places on December 27, 2006.

References

		
National Register of Historic Places in Chase County, Kansas
Bridges on the National Register of Historic Places in Kansas
Bridges completed in 1898
Arch bridges in the United States